John "Hartford Jack" Farrell (January 2, 1856 – November 15, 1916) was an outfielder in Major League Baseball in the 19th century.

External links

Footnotes 

1856 births
1916 deaths
19th-century baseball players
Major League Baseball center fielders
Hartford Dark Blues players
Baseball players from Hartford, Connecticut